Hardcore is an album by Daddy Freddy.

Track listing
"Weed" - 3:40
Featuring - Bruder & Kronstädta
"Hardcore" - 4:11
"Bring The Girls" - 3:39
"Dem Fools" - 3:34
Featuring - Joseph Cotton
"Ganja Feh Smoke" - 3:22
"Legal" - 5:10
Featuring - Bruder & Kronstädta, Das Department
"Journey Thru Life" - 4:02
"Godfather & Son" - 2:37
Featuring - Ranking Joe
"War" - 3:33
"Bad 2 The Bone" - 4:35
Featuring - Bruder & Kronstädta, Sen
"Don't Stop The Music" - 3:53
Featuring - Bernard Mayo, Joseph Cotton, Mynx
"Dem No Like We" - 3:22
"How Dem Look So" - 3:31
"Bad So" - 3:12
"All Night Fashion" - 3:15
"No 2nd Hand" - 3:24
"Born Traveller" - 3:09
"Mash Up Da Place" - 3:27
Backing Vocals - Dana Apitz
"Ganja (Jungle Mix)" - 3:23

Daddy Freddy albums
2004 albums